John Hackworth (born February 5, 1970, in Dunedin, Florida) is an American soccer coach who is currently Director of Coaching for St. Louis City SC of Major League Soccer and the interim head coach for the club's MLS Next Pro side.

Player
Hackworth graduated from Dunedin High School in his Florida hometown. He began his collegiate soccer career at Brevard College in 1988 and 1989. In 1990, he transferred to Wake Forest University where he redshirted and played in 1991 and 1992. 
 
Hackworth then played several years in the United States Development Soccer League. In 1997, his amateur team, La Correta, played against the Carolina Dynamo of the A-League in a game where Hackworth shut down the Trinidad & Tobago international Stern John.  As a result, the Dynamo signed him for the rest of the season.  Hackworth spent most of the season as a reserve, but played one game as the Dynamo finished runner-up in the championship.

Coach

Wake Forest & South Florida 
By the time Hackworth retired from playing in 1997, he had already spent several years coaching.  In 1993, Wake Forest University hired Hackworth as an assistant coach with the women's soccer team.  In 1994, he became an assistant with the men's team.  In 1998, the University of South Florida hired Hackworth head coach. During his four-year tenure, he took the team to two NCCA tournament appearances and compiled a 47–32–2 record. In 2002, Hackworth became an assistant to United States U-17 men's national soccer team coach John Ellinger.

United States U-17 National Team 
In 2004, when Ellinger left to become head coach at Real Salt Lake, USMNT head coach Bruce Arena appointed Hackworth to become the U-17 head coach. He coached the team at the FIFA U-17 World Cup in 2005 and 2007.   In the 2005 U-17 World Cup in Peru, Hackworth and the United States topped their group but lost to the Netherlands in the quarterfinals. In 2007, they finished second in their group but fell to the eventual third-place finisher, Germany, in the Round of 16. 
 
Following the 2007 U-17 World Cup, Hackworth joined Bob Bradley’s coaching staff as an assistant with the senior United States Men’s National Team. During his time with the National Team, he also served as the technical director of the U.S. Development Academy.

Assistant with USMNT 
As an assistant coach, Hackworth and the United States Men’s National Team finished second in the 2009 Confederations Cup, including a 2–0 victory over Spain in the semifinal, breaking the Spaniards' 35-game unbeaten streak and 15-game winning streak. Hackworth was also with the National Team as it qualified for the 2010 World Cup in South Africa in October 2009.

Philadelphia Union 
On November 9, 2009, Hackworth joined former U.S. Soccer colleague Piotr Nowak with the MLS expansion side Philadelphia Union as a coach and youth development coordinator. With that, Hackworth forwent going to the 2010 World Cup with the USMNT.

On June 13, 2012, Hackworth was announced as the Philadelphia Union's new interim coach. The club subsequently advanced to the 2012 U.S. Open Cup semifinals. Hackworth was given the title permanently on Aug. 30.

In his first full season in charge of the Union, the squad ranked as high as second in the Eastern Conference the week of June 24 but failed to reach the playoffs by three points. On June 10, 2014, he was relieved of his duties as team manager.

Return to U.S. Soccer 
Following his time with the Union, Hackworth was hired to be the United States U-15 head coach. Jürgen Klinsmann appointed Hackworth as an assistant to Andy Herzog for the U.S. Olympic Team. 
 
In December 2015, Hackworth was re-hired as U-17 National Team coach ahead of the 2017 FIFA U-17 World Cup in India and also oversaw the U.S. U-17 Residency Program. The United States advanced to the knockout round, where they defeated Paraguay by a 5–0 score. They lost in the quarterfinals to the eventual tournament champions, England. At that tournament, he coached notable United States internationals Sergiño Dest, Josh Sargent, and Timothy Weah.
 
From December 2017 through August 2018, Hackworth returned as an assistant coach with the senior national team.

Louisville City FC 
On August 2, 2018, Hackworth officially signed on as head coach for Louisville City FC. As the head coach, he led the team to a USL Championship title in 2018, guided them back to the final in 2019 and in 2020 saw LouCity post the Eastern Conference’s best regular-season record.

On April 27, 2021, it was announced that Hackworth and Louisville City had mutually terminated his contract. This came just three days after Louisville opened their 2021 season with a win over Atlanta United 2.

St. Louis City SC 
In October 2021, Hackworth was named director of coaching for Major League Soccer expansion club St. Louis City SC. On January 14, 2022, it was announced that Hackworth would serve as interim head coach for the club's MLS Next Pro side for the first half of the 2022 season.

Honors & Awards
While coaching at the University of South Florida, Hackworth was the chairman of the Conference USA’s men’s soccer committee. In 2000 he was a member of the NCAA selection committee.
 
In 2008, Hackworth was recognized as the U.S. Soccer Committee Developmental Coach of the Year for soccer.

Managerial statistics

Manager

Honors

Manager
Louisville City FC
USL Cup (1): 2018

St. Louis City SC 2
 MLS Next Pro Western Conference
 Winners (regular season): 2022
 Winners (playoffs): 2022
 Western Conference Frontier Division
 Winners:''' 2022.

Individual
USL Coach of the Month: September/October 2020

Personal
He is the father of Morgan Hackworth, who started his career as a professional player in 2019.

References

American soccer coaches
American soccer players
North Carolina Fusion U23 players
Brevard Tornados men's soccer players
South Florida Bulls men's soccer coaches
Wake Forest Demon Deacons men's soccer players
Philadelphia Union coaches
A-League (1995–2004) players
Living people
People from Dunedin, Florida
1970 births
Philadelphia Union non-playing staff
Association football defenders
Soccer players from Florida
Sportspeople from Pinellas County, Florida
Louisville City FC coaches
Wake Forest Demon Deacons women's soccer coaches
Wake Forest Demon Deacons men's soccer coaches